In 1980, Spain had competitors in archery, wheelchair basketball, swimming and athletics.

Spain won 1 gold medal, 13 silver medals and 9 bronze medals.

Background 
The 1980 Games were held in Arnhem, The Netherlands.  They could not be co-hosted with the Olympics because the Soviet Union claimed the country had no people with disabilities. Competitors with spinal cord injuries, amputations, cerebral palsy and vision impairments were eligible to compete in these Games.

Athletics 

None of Spain's gold medals, three silvers and three bronzed medals came in athletics.  Three of the medals were won by blind athletes and three were won by athletes with physical disabilities.

Swimming 

One of Spain's gold medals, ten silvers and six bronze medals came in swimming. None of the medals were won by blind athletes.  All medals were won by competitors with physical disabilities.

References

Nations at the 1980 Summer Paralympics
1980
1980 in Spanish sport